Terrell Lyday (born August 12, 1979) is an American former professional basketball player.

College career
Lyday played college basketball at Fresno CC (NJCAA), from 1997 to 1999, and at BYU (NCAA Division I), from 1999 to 2001.

Professional career
Lyday started his professional career in 2001 with Polish club Unia Tarnów. For the 2002–03 he moved to Turkish club Galatasaray. For the 2003–04 season he signed with French club Cholet, and for the next season he also played in France but with ASVEL. In the 2005–06 season he played with Russian club Ural Great and won the FIBA EuroCup Challenge.

In the 2006–07 season he played with Italian club Benetton Treviso and won the Italian Cup and the Supercup. In the 2007–08 season he played with Russian club Triumph Lyubertsy. In June 2008, he signed with Russian club UNICS Kazan. With UNICS he won the Russian Cup in 2009. In 2011, he won the EuroCup, and was named to the All-EuroCup First Team of the 2010–11 season. In June 2011, he extended his contract with UNICS Kazan for two more years. After the end of the 2012–13 season, he finished his professional career.

References

External links
Terrell Lyday at euroleague.net
Terrell Lyday at legabasket.it 
Terrell Lyday at lnb.fr 
Terrell Lyday at tblstat.net
Terrell Lyday at vtb-league.com

1979 births
Living people
American expatriate basketball people in France
American expatriate basketball people in Italy
American expatriate basketball people in Poland
American expatriate basketball people in Russia
American expatriate basketball people in Turkey
American men's basketball players
ASVEL Basket players
Basketball players from California
BC UNICS players
BC Zenit Saint Petersburg players
BYU Cougars men's basketball players
Cholet Basket players
Fresno City Rams men's basketball players
Galatasaray S.K. (men's basketball) players
Pallacanestro Treviso players
PBC Ural Great players
Shooting guards
Sportspeople from Fresno, California
Unia Tarnów basketball players